Syarhey Sinevich (born 11 January 1989) is a retired Belarusian professional footballer.

External links
Profile at teams.by

1989 births
Living people
Belarusian footballers
FC Energetik-BGU Minsk players
FC Torpedo-BelAZ Zhodino players
Association football goalkeepers